Filyovsky Park is a station on the Filyovskaya Line of the Moscow Metro. It opened in 1961 as part of the western extension of the Filyovsky radius.

Building
The station sits in a shallow cut, with the lower-level platform beneath (and perpendicular to) Minskaya street, which crosses it on an overpass. Two entrance vestibules (one opened in 2005 after a renovation) are on the upper level, providing access to the street. Most of the wall surfaces on the platform are faced with gray marble, though the overall appearance is spartan. The station was designed by Robert Pogrebnoi and Cheremin. Filyovsky Park is the most badly deteriorated of the surface stations and as a result is undergoing extensive renovations to repair four decades of damage caused by harsh weather, vibrations, and neglect.

External links
metro.ru
mymetro.ru
KartaMetro.info — Station location and exits on Moscow map (English/Russian)

Moscow Metro stations
Railway stations in Russia opened in 1961
Filyovskaya Line